The following is an index of sociopolitical thinkers listed by the first name.

Alphabetical list

Lists of other social and political philosophers 
List of Confucianists
List of critical theorists
List of Existentialists
List of political philosophers

Index of 

Lists of social scientists
List